Edward Walker Archer (12 December 1871 – 1 July 1940) was an Australian politician of Queensland.

Archer gained election to the Australian House of Representatives electoral Division of Capricornia on an Anti-Socialist platform on 12 December 1906, serving until 13 April 1910. When he was sworn in as an MP in February 1907, he chose to make an affirmation rather than swear an oath, making him the first member of the House of Representatives to do so.

Later, Archer switched to state politics, serving as member for the electorate of Normanby in the Legislative Assembly of Queensland between 5 March 1914 until the state election on 22 May 1915.

References

1871 births
1940 deaths
Members of the Australian House of Representatives
Members of the Australian House of Representatives for Capricornia
Free Trade Party members of the Parliament of Australia
Commonwealth Liberal Party members of the Parliament of Australia
20th-century Australian politicians
People educated at Whitgift School
British emigrants to Australia